The prime minister of the Cook Islands is the head of government of the Cook Islands, a self-governing territory in free association with New Zealand. The office was established in 1965, when self-government was first granted to the islands. Originally, the title "Premier" was used, but this was replaced by the title of "Prime Minister" in 1981.

List of officeholders
Key

See also
 Politics of the Cook Islands
 Monarchy in the Cook Islands
 King's Representative

References

External links
 World Statesmen – Cook Islands

Politics of the Cook Islands
Government of the Cook Islands
Cook Islands, List of Prime Ministers of
 
Prime Ministers